Monocreagra pheloides is a moth of the family Notodontidae first described by Cajetan and Rudolf Felder in 1874. It is found in Colombia, Ecuador and Peru.

References

Moths described in 1874
Notodontidae of South America